Yoshinari is both a masculine Japanese given name and a Japanese surname.

Possible writings
Yoshinari can be written using many different combinations of kanji characters. Here are some examples: 

義也, "justice, to be"
義成, "justice, turn into"
佳也, "skilled, to be"
佳成, "skilled, turn into"
善也, "virtuous, to be"
善成, "virtuous, turn into"
吉也, "good luck, to be"
吉成, "good luck, turn into"
良也, "good, to be"
良成, "good, turn into"
恭也, "respectful, to be"
嘉也, "excellent, to be"
嘉成, "excellent, turn into"
能成, "capacity, turn into"
喜成, "rejoice, turn into"

The name can also be written in hiragana よしなり or katakana ヨシナリ.

Notable people with the given name Yoshinari

Yoshinari Minamoto (源 義成, 1200–1219), the second son of the second Kamakura shōgun of Japan, Minamoto no Yoriie
Yoshinari Hatakeyama (畠山 義就, 1437?–1491), Japanese samurai and feudal lord (daimyō) of the Muromachi period (early 15th century)
Yoshinari Mori (森 可成, 1523–1570), Japanese samurai of the Sengoku period and the head of the Mori family, who served the Saitō clan
Yoshinari Kuwana (桑名 吉成, 1551–1615), senior retainer under the Chōsokabe clan during the latter years of the Sengoku period of Feudal Japan
, Japanese alpine skier
, Japanese professional wrestler who currently works for Pro Wrestling Noah
, former Japanese football player

Notable people with the surname Yoshinari 
, Japanese-Peruvian football player who currently plays for C.D. Universidad César Vallejo
, Japanese key animator, storyboard artist, and anime director

See also
Yoshinari Station, train station in Tokushima, Tokushima Prefecture, Japan

Japanese masculine given names